Hajji Nabi (also Romanized as Ḩājjī Nabī; also known as Deh-e Ḩājjī Nabī) is a village in Jahanabad Rural District, in the Central District of Hirmand County, Sistan and Baluchestan Province, Iran. At the 2006 census, its population was 22, in 7 families.

References 

Populated places in Hirmand County